John Landon may refer to:
 John Landon (Iowa politician)
 John Landon (Michigan politician)

See also
 Jon Landon, Canadian football player